This article lists diplomatic missions to the Principality of Andorra. Andorra hosts two embassies in its capital of Andorra la Vella. Some countries accredit an ambassador resident in Paris or Madrid, but conduct day-to-day relations and provide consular services from Consulates General in Barcelona or by resident Honorary Consuls in Andorra.

Embassies

Andorra la Vella

Consulates

Consulates-General
All are located in Barcelona.

Non-resident embassies
All are in Madrid unless another location is stated.

See also
 Foreign relations of Andorra
 List of diplomatic missions of Andorra

Notes

External links 
  Andorra Diplomatic List

References

Foreign relations of Andorra
Andorra
Diplomatic